Pat Quigley (born 11 June 1946 in Rathnure, County Wexford, Ireland) is an Irish retired sportsperson.  He played hurling with his local club Rathnure and was a member of the Wexford senior inter-county team from 1965 until 1970.

References

(Colleges Hurling team) won colleges All Ireland in 1962, St Peters College.

played minor with county in 62, 63, 64
played U21 in 64  All Ireland runnerup.  66 All Ireland runnerup after 2 replays and 67
and also All Ireland in 1965
Won Intermediate Leinster medal with Wexford in 1964, Railway cup medal in 1966 
Won 4 County senior medals and 2 Minor medals with Rathnure

1946 births
Living people
Rathnure hurlers
Wexford inter-county hurlers